Ratonhnhaké:ton (/radũnhaɡɛ̌ːdõ/), commonly known by his adopted name Connor, is a fictional character in the video game series Assassin's Creed, a half-British, half-Mohawk master assassin who serves as a central character in the games set around the American Revolution. He first appears as the main protagonist of Assassin's Creed III (2012), in which he is portrayed by Native American actor Noah Watts through performance capture, and voiced by Jamie Mayers as a young child. He also makes a minor appearance in the tie-in game Assassin's Creed III: Liberation, and is the narrator of the novel Assassin's Creed: Forsaken. The character has made further appearances in various spin-off media of the franchise.

Within the series' alternate historical setting, Ratonhnhaké:ton was born in 1756 as the illegitimate son of Haytham Kenway, a British nobleman and the leader of the North American colonial rite of the Templar Order, following his short-lived relationship with Kaniehtí:io, a Kanien’kehá:ka woman from the village of Kanatahséton. After witnessing his mother's death in an attack on their tribe in his youth, Ratonhnhaké:ton vows revenge on the Templars, whom he holds responsible, and eventually joins their rival organization, the Assassin Brotherhood (inspired by the real-life Order of Assassins), which was nearly exterminated the Templars years prior. The Colonial Brotherhood's sole surviving member, Achilles Davenport, reluctantly trains Ratonhnhaké:ton and gives him the Westernized name "Connor" to help him blend in with colonial society. Spending years to fight the Templars and rebuild the Colonial Brotherhood, Connor becomes a central figure in the American Revolution and the subsequent Revolutionary War as he helps the Patriot cause with the goal of protecting his people's lands from incursions and preventing the Templars from taking control of the young United States.

Connor's character has received a mixed critical reception, with some reviewers criticizing him as a dull and uninteresting protagonist, and an unlikeable character due to his hotheaded nature. More positive commentary focused on Connor being a misunderstood character with an interesting and symphathetic backstory, and on his distinct status as an Indigenous protagonist in the video game industry.

Creation and development

Connor was conceptualized as an individual with mixed Mohawk heritage to fill the role of an outsider for Assassin's Creed III's American Revolution setting. In developing Connor and the other Mohawk characters of the game, the team worked with the Kahnawà:ke Mohawk community near Montreal, contacting some of the residents to help translate Mohawk dialogue, and hired a Mohawk cultural consultant from the Kanien’kehá:ka Onkwawén:na Raotitióhkwa Language and Cultural Center, who ensured the characters were authentic and the team avoided stereotypes. In spite of the extensive research they have conducted into Mohawk culture and language, the team did not want Connor to be defined solely by his heritage. Alex Hutchison, the creative director of Assassin’s Creed III, said in a 2012 interview “I think that’s what attracted a lot of the groups to work with us. We had this idea that we’re just going to have a character, he’s a real character, he’s part of a 30-hour story, and you follow his whole life–and he’s also Native American [...] It’s not a cardboard cutout.” Ubisoft worked with two key members of the Kanien’kehá:ka: Akwiratékha Martin, the Kanien'kéha language teacher, and Teiowí:sonte Thomas Deer, the Mohawk cultural liaison, when developing Connor's character.

Portrayal
Connor is voiced by Noah Watts, who also physically portrayed the character in a motion capture studio. Watts originally got a call from his agent about an unnamed film set during the American Revolution and, eager to star in a period-piece film, went to the audition, unaware it was actually for Assassin's Creed III. He began his work with Ubisoft for the title in January 2012. Despite his Native American heritage, Watts is not a fluent speaker of the Mohawk language as he is a member of the Blackfeet Nation, and required a language consultant to help him get Connor's lines in Mohawk correct. Watts, a fan of the Assassin's Creed series, enjoyed his time voice acting and performance capturing for the game, and appreciated the opportunity to portray a Native character in such a public platform.

Watts explained that he based his portrayal of Connor on Cherokee actor Wes Studi's work in the 1992 film The Last of the Mohicans, particularly his matter-of-fact delivery style. He also chose to emphasize that English is the character's second language by purposefully not using contractions early on in the story and by implementing them towards the end of the game to signify how Connor's vocabulary has improved and developed over time.

Appearances

Assassin's Creed III
Connor is an ancestor (on the paternal side) of Desmond Miles, the protagonist of most of the early series' modern-day sequences, who experiences Connor's life through the Animus, a device unlocking hidden memories inside his DNA. As shown in Assassin's Creed III, he was born as Ratonhnhaké:ton in 1756 to Kaniehtí:io, a member of the Kanien'kehá:ka indigenous population, as the result of her brief relationship with Haytham Kenway, a British member of the Templar Order who had been sent to the American Colonies to establish a new rite for the Order and find the Grand Temple of the First Civilization—a precursor race that created humanity and powerful artifacts called "Pieces of Eden". Initially raised by his mother within the village of Kanatahséton in the Mohawk Valley region of Upstate New York, Ratonhnhaké:ton is four years old when he has his first encounter with the Templar Charles Lee, Haytham's right-hand man, who threatens to harm his people if they do not reveal the location of the Grand Temple, which they swore to protect from outsiders. Shortly after, Ratonhnhaké:ton finds his village aflame following an attack by enemy soldiers, and is unable to save his mother, leading him to swear revenge on Lee, who he assumes ordered the attack. 

In 1769, when Ratonhnhaké:ton is thirteen years old, the village elder gives him a Crystal Ball which allows Juno, a member of the First Civilization, to communicate with him. Juno explains that it is Ratonhnhaké:ton's destiny to defeat the Templars, and tells him to seek out the Colonial Assassin Brotherhood, which was nearly exterminated by the Templars years prior. Ratonhnhaké:ton travels to the homestead of Achilles Davenport, the retired mentor of the Colonial Brotherhood, who survived the Templars' purge. After impressing Achilles by defeating several bandits trying to rob him, he is allowed to stay and begins training as an Assassin. Achilles also gives Ratonhnhaké:ton the name Connor (after his late son, Connor Davenport) to help him blend in with colonial society. 

Over the following years, as his skills improve, Connor assassinates various Templars to prevent them from taking advantage of the American Revolution to further their plan of establishing a new nation under their rule. As a result, Connor becomes heavily involved in the Revolution and the Revolutionary War, helping the Patriots and the Founding Fathers in the hopes that they will in turn protect his people's lands from incursions and assist him in his hunt for the Templars. During this time, he also slowly rebuilds the Colonial Brotherhood, recruiting several new Assassin initiates after helping them liberate Boston and New York from British rule; turns Achilles' homestead into a small community by persuading a number of settlers to move there after assisting them with their problems; and renovates a decommissioned Assassin brig, the Aquila, which he then captains in a number of naval missions alongside his first mate, Robert Faulkner.

Around 1778, Connor runs into his father Haytham while they are both hunting a rogue Templar, Benjamin Church, and the two form an unstable alliance. As he spends time with his father, Connor comes to understand that the Assassins' and the Templars' goals are not so different, as they both ultimately desire peace and aim to further the Revolution, but disagrees with Haytham's belief that humanity should be controlled. Regardless, he still attempts to broker peace between the two orders, only for Haytham to reveal that George Washington was behind the attack on his village that killed Kaniehtí:io, prompting Connor to angrily break ties with both of them. He then returns to his village for the first time in years, only to discover that Charles Lee has recruited Mohawk warriors to fight back against the Patriots sent to eradicate them for their support of the Loyalist cause. Connor is forced to eliminate the warriors, including his childhood friend Kanen'tó:kon, to avoid conflict.

After Lee is disgraced by Washington for attempting to sabotage the outcome of the Battle of Monmouth and takes refuge in Fort George, Connor plans to siege the fort with the French's help. However, when he infiltrates the fort, he finds Haytham instead, and is forced to kill his father after a lengthy battle. During this time, Achilles passes away of old age, and Connor buries him next to his wife and son. In 1782, Connor tracks down Lee and both men are injured after a long pursuit throughout Boston. Lee takes refuge inside an inn, where Connor finally kills him after the two share a drink in silence; obtaining the key to the Grand Temple in the process, which Haytham gave to Lee before his death. Returning to his village, Connor finds it abandoned and learns from a hunter that the land has been sold to colonists to settle the U.S. government's war debts. He also finds the Crystal Ball left intact, and through it, Juno instructs him to conceal the key. Connor buries it in the grave of Achilles' son, before travelling to New York on Evacuation Day. There, he sees evidence of the slave trade still being active, and understands that the Revolution only benefited some people, at the expense of others.

In The Tyranny of King Washington expansion, set after the events of the base game, George Washington visits Connor to ask for his help in disposing of an Apple of Eden he has seized, which has been giving him nightmares of an alternate timeline where Kaniehtí:io was not killed in Connor's youth; as a result, he never became an Assassin, and Washington, corrupted by the Apple's power, has crowned himself the "Mad King" of the United States. Connor is transported into this alternate timeline after touching the Apple, but retains all of his original memories, and is gravely injured after Washington leads an attack on his and Kaniehtí:io's tribe, during which the latter is killed. After recovering, Connor works to depose the tyrant Washington, gaining a number of allies, including Samuel Adams, Benjamin Franklin, and Thomas Jefferson, as well as animal-based powers after brewing and drinking the Tea of the Great Willow, which has mystical properties. In the end, Connor is able to defeat Washington and they are both transported back to the original timeline, where Washington, terrified of the Apple's power, leaves it in Connor's care, who proceeds to toss it into the sea.

Other appearances
Connor makes a minor appearance in the spin-off game Assassin's Creed III: Liberation, set during the events of Assassin's Creed III. By linking the two games, the player can unlock an exclusive mission in Liberation featuring him; this mission is automatically included in the subsequent re-releases of Liberation. In 1777, Connor meets with Aveline de Grandpré, a fellow Assassin from the Louisiana branch of the Colonial Brotherhood, to help her track down a Templar and Loyalist officer. The two work together to infiltrate the fort where the officer has taken refuge, with Connor creating a distraction while Aveline assassinates the officer. Afterwards, Aveline asks Connor if he is always certain of the ways of the Assassins; he responds that he only trusts "in his own hands", and the two part ways. In the Aveline expansion pack for the 2013 title Assassin's Creed IV: Black Flag, it is revealed that Connor kept in contact with Aveline, who helped him in his mission to rebuild the Colonial Brotherhood after the Revolutionary War. In 1784, Connor asks for Aveline's help in finding and recruiting a former slave, Patience Gibbs, to the Assassins, because she fought him off when he tried talking to her.

In the modern-day section of Black Flag, a market analysis for Abstergo Entertainment, the fictional video games subsidiary of Abstergo Industries, can be found via hacking computers. The Market Analysis reveals Abstergo was looking into the possibility of using Connor as the protagonist of a future project, but ultimately decided against it due to finding him too calm and stoic outside of the occasional moments of anger, and thinking that most audiences would not be interested in learning about Mohawk culture. Despite this, Abstergo considered the possibility of significantly reducing Connor's role and instead making a product about George Washington. This idea has materialized in Assassin's Creed Unity, where the fictional video game Washington and the Wolf, featuring Connor on the cover, can be seen at the start.

Like other of the series' protagonists, Connor's outfit has been featured as an unlockable cosmetic options in several subsequent releases (namely Black Flag, Unity, and Assassin's Creed Rogue). In 2022, Connor was added as a playable character to the free to play role-playing mobile game Assassin's Creed Rebellion.

In literature, Connor has appeared as the narrator of the novel Assassin's Creed: Forsaken, where he recovers and reads through his father's journal sometime after the latter's death. Upon learning of Haytham's tragic life and the fact that he genuinely cared for his son and did his best to protect him, he realizes he misjudged his father and regrets not being able to reconcile with him. In 2017, Connor was featured in the fourth and final issue of the Assassin's Creed: Reflections comic book miniseries, in which it is revealed that, at some point following the events of Assassin's Creed III, he married a woman from a nearby tribe and had three children, including a daughter named Io:nhiòte, who inherited his rare ability of 'Eagle Vision'.

Reception

Connor received a mixed critical reception, being often contrasted with his well-received father, Haytham, who is playable in the first few chapters of Assassin's Creed III, as well as the previous protagonists in the series, Altaïr Ibn-LaʼAhad and Ezio Auditore da Firenze, the latter of whom in particular was critically acclaimed. In a contemporary review of Assassin's Creed III for PSM3, Joel Gregory was disappointed by Connor's character arc, saying that although his skills develop over the course of the main storyline, his personality does not. He also called Connor "relentlessly strait-laced and humourless", and "duller than Altair and a world away from Ezio."

Connor has placed low on numerous Assassin's Creed character rankings. In a 2021 list by PC Gamer, he came out last, with the reviewer calling Connor a boring protagonist who "sulks, pouts, and complains his way through what is also the worst Assassin's Creed game." On the same list, Haytham placed fourth due to being a more complex and fun character to play as than Connor. German outlet GamePro ranked Connor as the franchise's 13th-greatest protagonist, criticizing his lack of development and blind devotion to the Assassin Order, but acknowledging that he is a more nuanced character than most people give him credit for, and that he might rank higher if he was given a sequel to flesh out his character. In a list by CBR ranking the Assassin's Creed protagonists by likability, Connor finished second to last due to his hotheaded and violent nature.

However, not all reception of the character was negative. In his review of Assassin's Creed III, PC Gamer's Chris Thursten said that Connor's characterisation is strong, and that he "will get some flak simply for not being Ezio, but he comes into his own in the second half of the game." In a 2020 ranking of the franchise's Assassins by TheGamer, Connor finished fifth for holding onto his convictions and desire for justice even when they put him into conflict with his allies.

Connor was nominated for "Character of the Year" at the 2012 Spike Video Game Awards, and Best Character Design at the 4th Inside Gaming Awards in 2012.

Indigenous representation 
In a 2022 retrospective on Indigenous representation in video games, Comic Book Resources highlighted Assassin's Creed III and the character of Connor as a "valiant effort," and praised Ubisoft's decision to work with Mohawk consultants in order to portray and explore Native American culture, beliefs and language respectfully.

Notes

References

Assassin's Creed characters
Fictional American Revolutionary War veterans
Fictional axefighters
Fictional blade and dart throwers
Fictional clubfighters
Fictional Native American people in video games
Fictional Iroquois people
Fictional European-American people
Fictional characters from New York (state)
Fictional criminals in video games
Fictional fist-load fighters
Fictional hapkido practitioners
Fictional human rights activists
Fictional hunters in video games
Fictional knife-fighters
Fictional musketeers and pistoleers
Fictional professional hunters
Fictional martial arts trainers
Fictional mass murderers
Fictional military personnel in video games
Fictional patricides
Fictional people from the 18th-century
Fictional privateers
Fictional sea captains
Fictional rope fighters
Fictional swordfighters in video games
Fictional traceurs and freerunners
Male characters in video games
Orphan characters in video games
Video game characters introduced in 2012
Video game protagonists
Vigilante characters in video games
Fictional gunfighters in video games